The WEY P8 is a mid-size crossover SUV produced by Great Wall Motor under the premium brand, WEY, and is essentially the PHEV version of the WEY VV7.

Overview

The P8 was launched in 2018 producing 340 hp and 524 Nm of torque with prices ranging from 259,800 to 279,800 yuan. 

WEY claimed an acceleration of 0 to 100 kilometers per hour in 6.5 seconds, a 50 kilometer electric range, a 600 kilometer combined range, and a fuel consumption of 2.3 liters per 100 kilometers. 

As of July 2018, rumors told of a fastback version called the WEY P8 GT PHEV planned to be launched with similar performance as the regular WEY P8.

WEY P8 GT

Originally launched as the WEY Pi4 VV7x in 2017, the production version was launched in 2018 and was renamed to WEY P8 GT, and is essentially the fastback version of the WEY P8 while featuring a redesigned front fascia and different headlamps.

References

P8
Plug-in hybrid vehicles
Partial zero-emissions vehicles
Mid-size sport utility vehicles
All-wheel-drive vehicles
Cars introduced in 2018
Cars of China